Bigg Boss 16 also known as Bigg Boss: Game Badlega, Kyunki Bigg Boss Khud Khelega! is the sixteenth season of the Indian Hindi-language reality TV series Bigg Boss. It premiered on Colors TV from 1 October 2022. Salman Khan hosted the show for the thirteenth time. The Grand Finale was Aired on 12 February 2023 and was won by Indian rapper MC Stan while Shiv Thakare emerged as 1st Runner-up respectively.

Production

Broadcast
For the first time ever, a new segment- Bigg Bulletin With Shekhar Suman aired on Sunday Hosted by Shekhar Suman. Weekend Ka Vaar, namely- Shukravar and Shanivar Ka Vaar aired on Fridays and Saturdays instead of Saturdays and Sundays respectively as in previous seasons. For the first time ever, eviction took place on Saturdays instead of Sundays.

A five hour Grand Finale aired on 12th February 2023.

Casting
Colors TV teased the viewers, by giving a glimpse of the first two contestants answering several fan question on their Instagram stories. This segment was titled "#BB16ContestantFirstLook". They were later on revealed to be Gautam Singh Vig and Soundarya Sharma.

Concept
The concept for this season of Bigg Boss was "Upside Down", which meant everything would be opposite from the previous seasons.

Development 

The press conference and launch event for this season was held on 27 September 2022, anchored by Gauahar Khan, wherein Abdu Rozik was officially introduced as first contestant.

Eye Logo
The eye logo is very similar to the logo of thirteenth season. It features a bright red color logo with a blue pupil.

House
The house of this season had a "Circus" theme. The House was located in Goregaon for the fourth time. This season had 4 bedrooms: Fire Room, Black and White Room, Cards Room and Vintage Room and a lavish private Jacuzzi for the captain for the first time in the history of Bigg Boss. The jail of the house was designed as Maut Ka Kuwa (Well of Death) located in a hanging position above the swimming pool.

Release
A promo featuring Salman Khan was released on 11 September 2022. Promos featuring Gori Nagori, Nimrit Kaur Ahluwalia and Abdu Rozik with Khan were released one day prior to the premiere. Promos featuring Priyanka Choudhary, Ankit Gupta and Tina Datta were released just before the premiere.

Housemates status

Housemates
The list of contestants in the order of entering the house:

Original entrants
Nimrit Kaur Ahluwalia – Actress and model. She is best known for her dual roles as Meher Kaur Dhillon Gill and Seher Kaur Gill Babbar in Choti Sarrdaarni. Nimrit is also a lawyer, theatre artist and social activist by profession.
Abdu Rozik – Singer and boxer from Tajikistan. He is known to be the shortest singer in the world.
Ankit Gupta – Actor. He is best known for his leading role as Fateh Singh Virk in Udaariyan. Gupta also appeared in Kundali Bhagya, Kuch Rang Pyar Ke Aise Bhi and Begusarai.
Priyanka Choudhary – Television actress. She is best known for her leading portrayal of Tejo Kaur Sandhu in soap drama Udaariyan opposite Ankit Gupta. Choudhary was also seen in Yeh Hai Chahatein and Gathbandhan.
MC Stan – A rapper and music producer best known for his album songs of Tadipaar and Insaan.
Archana Gautam – Actress, model, beauty pageant title holder and politician. She joined Indian National Congress in November 2021.
Gautam Singh Vig – Actor. He is best known for his leading role as Surya Seth in Saath Nibhaana Saathiya 2.
Shalin Bhanot – Actor. He is best known for his role as Keshav in Zee TV's Naaginn. Bhanot is also the winner of StarPlus dance reality show Nach Baliye 4.
Soundarya Sharma – Actress, model and dentist. She is known for romantic musical film Ranchi Diaries.
Shiv Thakare – Reality TV star. He is the winner of Bigg Boss Marathi (season 2). Shiv is also known for participating in MTV Roadies Rising.
Sumbul Touqeer – Actress. She is best known for her role Imlie Chaturvedi Rathore in Imlie. Sumbul also appeared in Chandragupta Maurya and Article 15.
Manya Singh – Model and Femina Miss India 2020 runner-up.
Gori Nagori – Dancer. She is a Rajasthani-born dancer who is best known for her performance on different Bhojpuri and Hariyanvi songs.
Tina Datta – Television actress. She is best known for her dual roles as Ichcha and Meethi in Colors TV's longest-running show Uttaran. Datta has also seen as contestant in stunt-based reality show Fear Factor: Khatron Ke Khiladi 7.
Sreejita De – Actress. She is best known for her role Mukta in popular show Uttaran. De has also played Dilruba and Sanam in Nazar and Aliya in Yeh Jaadu Hai Jinn Ka!.
Sajid Khan – Director, filmmaker, comedian and television presenter. Khan has directed films like Heyy Babyy, Housefull, Housefull 2.

Wild card entrants
Vikkas Manaktala – Actor. He is best known for Portraying Cadet Amardeep Hudda in Left Right Left and Gangadhar Rao in Jhansi Ki Rani on Colors TV.

Guest entrants
Fahmaan Khan – Actor. He entered the house to support Sumbul and to promote his show Dharampatnii on Day 54 and exited on Day 55.
Sunny Nanasaheb Waghchaure – Businessman known as Golden Boy on social media. He entered the house on Day 60 along with Sanjay Gujar and exited on Day 63.
Sanjay Gujar – Businessman known as Golden Boy on social media. He entered the house on Day 60 along with Sunny Nanasaheb Waghchoure and exited on Day 63.

Twists

Bedroom allotment

Housemates were chosen by the Captain / Task winners to be staying in 4 different bedrooms: Fire Room, Black and White Room, Cards Room and Vintage Room. Every week the bedrooms of the housemates were chosen newly and the housemates had to stay in the chosen bedrooms. In Week 7, members of Vintage Room and Cards Room were safe from nominations. In Week 8, Week 10, only members of Vintage Room were safe from nominations. Vintage Room was permanently closed from Week 17. Fire Room was closed from Week 17 but reopened in Week 19. Black & White Room and Cards Room were also closed in Week 19.

Key: 

 indicates Captain's/King's or Queen's Room
 indicates Black and White Room (Room of 4)
 indicates Cards Room (Room of 3)
 indicates Vintage Room (Room of 2)
 indicates Fire Room (Room of 6)

Morning Anthem
For the first time ever, there is a Bigg Boss Anthem in the morning instead of the usual wakeup songs.

Bigg Bulletin
A new segment, Bigg Bulletin with Shekhar Suman, was introduced which Shekhar Suman hosted every Sunday. In this segment, the host interacted with the contestants on the events that have transpired in the particular week. He would also roast the contestants, play games with them and pull off fun gags.

MyGlamm Face of the Season
In Week 1, it was revealed that all the female housemates would be competitors for MyGlamm Face of the Season through which one female housemate would become the representative of the season. Moreover, the winner of the segment would win ₹25 lakhs and get a chance to shoot for an ad with Shraddha Kapoor for MyGlamm.

On Day 83, Priyanka Choudhary was declared the winner after 12 weeks through public votes.

Confinement punishment(s)

Maahim (Dog)
On Day 87 (Week 13), "Maahim" a St. Bernard dog was sent in the house.

Family week
In Week 15, family members of the 12 housemates, referred to as VVIPs, entered the house to meet and support them.

Weekly summary

Guest appearances

Nominations table 

 

Color Key
  indicates the House Captain.
  indicates the House King/Queen.
  indicates the Royal Favourites.
  indicates the Nominees for house captaincy.
  indicates that the Housemate was directly nominated for eviction prior to the regular nominations process.
  indicates that the housemate went to secret room.
  indicates that the housemate was granted immunity from nominations.
  indicates the winner.
  indicates the first runner up.
  indicates the second runner up.
  indicates the third runner up.
  indicates the fourth runner up.
  indicates that the contestant has re-entered the house.
  indicates that the contestant walked out of the show.
  indicates that the contestant was ejected out of the house.
  indicates that the contestant was evicted.

Notes 
 : As Nimrit was the first housemate to enter the Bigg Boss house, she was immediately assigned as the first House Captain by Bigg Boss.
 : Being the House Captain, Nimrit had the power to automatically nominate two contestants.
 : Gori won a task and saved herself from eviction.
 : Nimrit was fired from Captaincy but was allowed to fight for her position once again. Nimrit and Shalin competed in a task where Nimrit won back her Captaincy.
 : Shalin was nominated by Bigg Boss for two consecutive weeks as a punishment for physical violence.
 :Shiv was fired from Captaincy on Day 20 and Archana was made the new captain by Bigg Boss.
 : Archana was freed from Captaincy after her duration was completed.
 :Gautam was fired from Captaincy.
 : Tina briefly left the house on Day 33 due to the passing of her pet. She returned on the same day.
 : MC Stan was nominated by Bigg Boss for four consecutive weeks as a punishment for being physically violent against Shalin.
 : Priyanka was given choice by Bigg Boss to either save Ankit from on-the-spot eviction or get 25 lakh rupees of prize money back. Priyanka chose to save Ankit from eviction.
 : All 5 finalists were told to mutually evict one housemate and if the decision meets the audience's decision, 10 lakhs will be added to the prize money.
'

References

External links 

 Bigg Boss 16 at Colors TV
 Bigg Boss 16 on Voot
 Bigg Boss 16 on JioCinema

Bigg Boss (Hindi TV series) seasons
2022 Indian television seasons